Luchazes is a town and municipality in Moxico province, Angola. It is one of the four Municipalities predominantly inhabited by the Mbunda in Angola. Its principal town is Kangamba. The municipality had a population of 14,451 in 2014.

See also
Mbunda people

References

Populated places in Moxico Province
Municipalities of Angola